Westervelt–Cameron House, is located in Ridgewood, Bergen County, New Jersey, United States. The house was built in 1767 and was added to the National Register of Historic Places on January 10, 1983.  This home was meticulously renovated, restored and extended in 2009.  This home is one of the most sustainable and historical homes in all of New Jersey.

See also
National Register of Historic Places listings in Bergen County, New Jersey

References

Houses on the National Register of Historic Places in New Jersey
Houses completed in 1767
Houses in Bergen County, New Jersey
National Register of Historic Places in Bergen County, New Jersey
Ridgewood, New Jersey
New Jersey Register of Historic Places
1767 establishments in New Jersey